The Bazjaš or Baziaș monastery is a medieval Serbian Orthodox monastery located in the Baziaș village, Socol Commune, Caraș-Severin County, Romania. It was established in 1225. The monastery lies in the Clisura Dunării-region.

References

Baziaş

13th-century Serbian Orthodox church buildings
Serbian Orthodox monasteries in Romania
1225 establishments in Europe
Religious organizations established in the 1220s
Christian monasteries established in the 13th century
Buildings and structures in Caraș-Severin County